Andrew T. Mooradian (August 26, 1923 – October 26, 1994) was an American football, basketball, and baseball player, coach, and college athletics administrator.  He served as the head coach of the University of New Hampshire's men's basketball team during the 1950–51 season, compiling a 4–12 record. He served as the head coach of the university's football team for the 1965 season, compiling an 0–8 record.  Mooradian was also the Wildcats' head baseball coach for three seasons, from 1963 to 1965.

Mooradian died of cancer on October 26, 1994.

Head coaching record

Football

References

External links
 

1923 births
1994 deaths
American men's basketball players
Basketball coaches from Massachusetts
Basketball players from Massachusetts
College men's basketball head coaches in the United States
New Hampshire Wildcats athletic directors
New Hampshire Wildcats baseball coaches
New Hampshire Wildcats baseball players
New Hampshire Wildcats football coaches
New Hampshire Wildcats football players
New Hampshire Wildcats men's basketball coaches
New Hampshire Wildcats men's basketball players
Yankee Conference commissioners
Deaths from cancer in New Hampshire